SARA - Satélite de Reentrada Atmosférica is a Brazilian satellite project, with the objective of performing experiments in microgravity environment and returning them to the Earth.

SARA Suborbital

SARA Suborbital 1/Operação São Lourenço
The proposed flight schedule includes a first sub-orbital test flight (SARA Suborbital 1) in 2014 using a VS-40 rocket launched from the Centro de Lançamento da Barreira do Inferno (Operação São Lourenço). The predicted apogee is 350 km with a range of 300 km. Time spent in microgravity will be around 8 minutes, after which the satellite will reenter the atmosphere and be recovered at sea, 100 km out from Parnaíba.

On 13/11/2015 the launch was attempted, resulting on an explosion of the VS-40M V03 rocket on the pad.

SARA Suborbital 2
A second suborbital flight was planned (SARA Suborbital 2), to test flight attitude control system and de-orbit engine.

Configuration
The "Sara suborbital" platform heights 350 kg and is divided into four subsystems:
 Structural
 Electrical - includes cold gas actuators, designed to null the satellite's angular velocity after launch
 Recovery - 3 parachutes: pilot, drogue and main
 Experiment module (MEXP)

SARA Orbital
The orbital version of the satellite will operate in a circular 300 km low earth orbit, during a maximum of 10 days.

References

Satellites of Brazil